Alliage was a French boy band active from 1996 to 2000.

History
Alliage  was assembled during the 1990s boy band craze. The musical group was met with the most commercial success in France alongside fellow boy acts like Worlds Apart, 2Be3 and G-Squad. The band included four young men; Steven Gunnell, Roman Lata Ares, Brian Torres and lead singer Quentin Elias. Alliage, whose name translates as "mixture," was marketed as a multicultural fusion of several different ethnic origins: Corsican, Spanish, American, and Algerian-French, respectively. Some of their songs were "alliages" of several languages such as "Baila" and "Lucy".

The group's breakthrough hit was their first single "Baila" ("Dance, I love you, your memory still follows me") which sold more than 450,000 copies. Their first album titled Alliage, l'album was released in 1997, selling more than 500,000 copies. At the peak of their success, Alliage collaborated with Irish boy band Boyzone on "Te garder près de moi" and Swedish band Ace of Base on "Cruel Summer".

Break up and later
By the end of the 1990s Alliage's record sales declined as boy bands fell out of favor with the public.

Quentin Elias was the first to leave the group and embark on a solo career in 1999. Elias was based in New York City. He remained active as a recording artist, model and actor in films, television and theater until his sudden death in 2014.

Gunnell also become soloist and recorded an album of Catholic music called In terra, having rediscovered his creed and passion for the opera.

Ares began a career in photography and became the editor of the Spanish edition of V Magazine. Torres became a male model and actor.

Discography

Albums

Singles

External links

French boy bands
French pop music groups
Musical groups established in 1996
Musical groups disestablished in 2000